José Prado Macías Salazar (born January 25, 1972) is a retired utility man who played in 
Major League Baseball for the Detroit Tigers, Montreal Expos and Chicago Cubs in all of parts of seven seasons spanning 1999–2005. Listed at 5' 10", 173 lb., Macías was a switch-hitter and threw right-handed. He was born in Panama City, Panama. He is currently the first base coach for the Diablos Rojos del México of the Mexican League.

Career
Macias was a reliable and versatile player, being able to cover several positions competently and adapt while maintaining the highest performance standards for the team. He was used mostly at third base, but also played in the middle infield and all three outfield positions. Eventually, he pitched in his home country of Panama and was ready to serve as an emergency catcher if need, as he expressed a desire to play all nine positions in a game if at any point his team can afford it.

Macias was released by the Cubs during the offseason in 2005. He then signed with the Hokkaido Nippon Ham Fighters of Japan, where he played in 2006. After that, he signed a Minor League contract with the Milwaukee Brewers and played the entire 2007 season with their Triple-A affiliate, the Nashville Sounds, and then agreed to a minor-league deal with the Pittsburgh Pirates in 2008, but was released during spring training. As a result, Macías signed a contract to play in the Mexican League with the Diablos Rojos del Mexico for that season and joined the Piratas de Campeche from 2009 to 2010.

In between, Macías played winter ball with the Leones del Caracas and Tiburones de La Guaira clubs of the Venezuelan Professional Baseball League, and for the Algodoneros de Guasave, Mayos de Navojoa, Tomateros de Culiacán and Yaquis de Obregón of the Mexican Pacific League, retiring in 2011.

Macías currently serves as the hitting coach for the Diablos Rojos del México of the Mexican Baseball League.

External links

1972 births
Living people
Algodoneros de Guasave players
Baseball players at the 2011 Pan American Games
Chicago Cubs players
Delmarva Shorebirds players
Detroit Tigers players
Diablos Rojos del México players
Gulf Coast Expos players
Hokkaido Nippon-Ham Fighters players
Jacksonville Suns players
Lakeland Tigers players
Leones del Caracas players
Panamanian expatriate baseball players in Venezuela
Major League Baseball infielders
Major League Baseball outfielders
Major League Baseball players from Panama
Mayos de Navojoa players
Mexican League baseball second basemen
Mexican League baseball third basemen
Montreal Expos players
Nashville Sounds players
Mexican League baseball outfielders
Nippon Professional Baseball infielders
Nippon Professional Baseball outfielders
Pan American Games competitors for Panama
Panamanian expatriate baseball players in Canada
Panamanian expatriate baseball players in Japan
Panamanian expatriate baseball players in Mexico
Panamanian expatriate baseball players in the United States
Sportspeople from Panama City
Piratas de Campeche players
Tiburones de La Guaira players
Toledo Mud Hens players
Tomateros de Culiacán players
Vermont Expos players
Yaquis de Obregón players
Panamanian expatriate baseball players in Australia